Manchester Originals are a franchise 100-ball cricket side based in the city of Manchester. The team represents the historic county of Lancashire in the newly founded The Hundred competition, beginning in the 2021 season, and playing at Old Trafford.

History 

The announcement of the new eight-team men's and women's tournament series in 2019 was not without controversy, with the likes of Virat Kohli criticising the England and Wales Cricket Board for pursuing a shift away from Test cricket, while others argued the format should have followed the established and successful Twenty20 format. The ECB, however, decided it needed a unique format to draw crowds.

It was announced in June 2019 that the side would be named the Manchester Originals, and would draw on players from Lancashire in the inaugural draft. It had been reported that other names such as the Manchester Bees and a Lancashire name were considered but rejected.

Other regions such as Surrey and Kent were required to amalgamate their Hundred sides, however, Lancashire was one of the few regions spared this controversy. Lancashire chief executive Daniel Gidney has however suggested this will serve as a handicap for the region rather than a benefit, arguing that the other merged regions will enjoy greater marketing powers and better coaching resources.

In July 2019 the side announced that former Lancashire and Australia batsman Simon Katich would be the team's first coach. Katich most recently coached Caribbean Premier League winners Trinbago Knight Riders and Royal Challengers Bangalore in the Indian Premier League. He is joined by Lancashire head coach Glen Chapple and assistant coach Mark Chilton.

The inaugural Hundred draft took place in October 2019 and with the Originals having claimed Jos Buttler as their England centrally-contracted player, and Kate Cross and Sophie Ecclestone the women's players, they were looking to build on their early picks. They were also joined by England internationals Matt Parkinson and Saqib Mahmood as local icon picks (players from their director county Lancashire).

Honours

Men's honours 

The Hundred
Runners-up: 2022

Women's honours 

The Hundred
5th place: 2021 (highest finish)

Ground 

The Originals play at the home of Lancashire Cricket Club, Old Trafford Cricket Ground, to the south of Manchester. The women's team had been due to also use Sedbergh School in Sedbergh, Cumbria for some matches but this plan was abandoned when both teams were brought together at the same ground as a result of the Covid-19 pandemic.

Players

Current squad

Men's side 
 Bold denotes players with international caps.
  denotes a player who is unavailable for rest of the season.

Men's captains
 Italics denote a temporary captain when the main captain was unavailable.

Women's side 
 Bold denotes players with international caps.
  denotes a player who is unavailable for rest of the season.

Women's captains
 Italics denote a temporary captain when the main captain was unavailable.

Seasons

Group stages

Knockout rounds

See also 

 List of Manchester Originals cricketers
 List of cricket grounds in England and Wales
 List of Test cricket grounds

References

Further reading 

https://www.thehundred.com/ - The official website of the entire competition
 BBC: The Hundred player draft – covering the first draft signings for each region's team

External links 

Official web page

Lancashire County Cricket Club
Cricket in Lancashire
Sport in Trafford
The Hundred (cricket) teams
2019 establishments in England
Manchester Originals